Aculifera is a proposed clade of molluscs incorporating those groups that have no conch or shell, that is, the Polyplacophora, Caudofoveata (=Chaetodermomorpha) and Solenogastres (=Neomeniomorpha).
It is sister to the Conchifera.

The oldest known aculiferan is Qaleruaqia, which was found in the Aftenstjernesø Formation in Greenland, which dates back to the Cambrian Stage 4.

References

Mollusc taxonomy